ERMS may refer to:
 Erms, a river of Germany
 Electronic Resource Management System
 Embryonal rhabdomyosarcoma
 Emissions Reduction Market System
 European Register of Marine Species

See also 
 ERM (disambiguation)